The Boone County Courthouse is the location of the 13th Judicial Circuit of Missouri, covering Boone and Callaway counties. The courthouse is in the Boone County Government Complex in downtown Columbia, Missouri.  It is the third court at this location. The first housed a studio of George Caleb Bingham and is the subject of the 1855 painting Verdict of the People.

The courthouse, at 705 E. Walnut Street, is a contributing property to the Downtown Columbia Historic District.

References

Further reading
Ohman, Marian M. "Oh! Justice -- .": The History of Boone County Courthouses. Columbia: University of Missouri Extension, 1979.
Switzler, Wm. F. History of Boone County. St. Louis: Western Historical Company, 1882.

External links
 13th circuit court of Missouri

Buildings and structures in Columbia, Missouri
National Register of Historic Places in Columbia, Missouri
County courthouses in Missouri
Historic district contributing properties in Missouri
National Register of Historic Places in Boone County, Missouri
Courthouses on the National Register of Historic Places in Missouri
1909 establishments in Missouri